The Moffat distribution, named after the physicist Anthony Moffat, is a continuous probability distribution based upon the Lorentzian distribution.  Its particular importance in astrophysics is due to its ability to accurately reconstruct point spread functions, whose wings cannot be accurately portrayed by either a Gaussian or Lorentzian function.

Characterisation

Probability density function
The Moffat distribution can be described in two ways. Firstly as the distribution of a bivariate random variable (X,Y) centred at zero, and secondly as the distribution of the corresponding radii

In terms of the random vector (X,Y), the distribution has the probability density function (pdf)
 

In this form, the distribution is a reparameterisation of a bivariate Student distribution with zero correlation.

In terms of the random variable R, the distribution has density

Relation to other distributions 
 Pearson distribution
 Student's t-distribution for 

References

 A Theoretical Investigation of Focal Stellar Images in the Photographic Emulsion (1969) – A. F. J. Moffat

Continuous distributions
Equations of astronomy